The 2014 IFSC Climbing World Cup was held in 16 locations. Bouldering competitions were held in 8 locations, lead in 8 locations, and speed in 7 locations. The season began on 26 April in Chongqing, China and concluded on 16 November in Kranj, Slovenia.

The top 3 in each competition received medals, and the overall winners were awarded trophies. At the end of the season an overall ranking was determined based upon points, which athletes were awarded for finishing in the top 30 of each individual event.

The winners for bouldering were Jan Hojer and Akiyo Noguchi, for lead Jakob Schubert and Jain Kim, for speed Danyil Boldyrev and Mariia Krasavina, and for combined Sean McColl and Akiyo Noguchi, men and women respectively.
The National Team for bouldering was Japan, for lead Austria, and for speed Russian Federation.

Highlights of the season 
In bouldering, at the World Cup in Baku, Anna Stöhr of Austria flashed all boulders in the final round to take the win.

In speed climbing, at the World Cup in Arco, Libor Hroza of Czech Republic set new world records twice at 5.76 seconds in the qualification round and 5.73 seconds in the quarter final against Ukraine's Danyil Boldyrev's 5.75 seconds. The previous world record was 5.88s, set by Evgenii Vaitcekhovskii of Russia at the 2012 Speed World Cup in Xining, China.

France was the only nation in the top three National Team Ranking in all disciplines.

Overview

Bouldering 
An overall ranking was determined based upon points, which athletes were awarded for finishing in the top 30 of each individual event. The national ranking was the sum of the points of that country's three best male and female athletes. Results displayed (in brackets) were not counted.

Men 
The results of the ten most successful athletes of the Bouldering World Cup 2014:

Women 
The results of the ten most successful athletes of the Bouldering World Cup 2014:

National Teams
The results of the ten most successful countries of the Bouldering World Cup 2014:

Country names as used by the IFSC

Lead 
An overall ranking was determined based upon points, which athletes were awarded for finishing in the top 30 of each individual event. The national ranking was the sum of the points of that country's three best male and female athletes. Results displayed (in brackets) were not counted.

Men 
The results of the ten most successful athletes of the Lead World Cup 2014:

Women 
The results of the ten most successful athletes of the Lead World Cup 2014:

National Teams 
The results of the ten most successful countries of the Lead World Cup 2014:

Country names as used by the IFSC

Speed 
An overall ranking was determined based upon points, which athletes were awarded for finishing in the top 30 of each individual event. The national ranking was the sum of the points of that country's three best male and female athletes. Results displayed (in brackets) were not counted.

Men 
The results of the ten most successful athletes of the Speed World Cup 2014:

Women 
The results of the ten most successful athletes of the Speed World Cup 2014:

National Teams 
The results of the ten most successful countries of the Speed World Cup 2014:

Country names as used by the IFSC

Combined 
5 best competition results are counting for IFSC Climbing Worldcup 2014. Not counting points are in brackets.

Participation in at least 2 disciplines is required.

Men 
The results of the ten most successful athletes of the Combined World Cup 2014:

Women 
The results of the ten most successful athletes of the Combined World Cup 2014:

References 

IFSC Climbing World Cup
2014 in sport climbing